The Presidents' Trophy is an award presented by the National Hockey League (NHL) to the team that finishes with the most points (i.e. best record) during the NHL regular season. If two teams are tied for the most points, then the Trophy goes to the team with the most regulation wins (RW). The Presidents' Trophy has been awarded 35 times to 18 different teams since its inception during the 1985–86 NHL season.

As the team with the best regular season record, the Presidents' Trophy winner is normally guaranteed home-ice advantage throughout the entire Stanley Cup playoffs. However, it does not guarantee playoff success, as the winner of the Presidents' Trophy has won the Stanley Cup only eight times. Three other teams reached the Stanley Cup Finals, but failed to win. The most recent team to win both the Presidents' Trophy and the Stanley Cup in the same season were the 2012–13 Chicago Blackhawks. The only team to accomplish this more than once is the Detroit Red Wings.

History
The Trophy was introduced at the start of the  NHL season by the League's Board of Governors. Prior to this, the best team in the League during the regular season was allowed to hang a banner reading "NHL League Champions."

A total of 18 teams have won the Presidents' Trophy. The Detroit Red Wings have won six Presidents' Trophies, the most of any team. The Boston Bruins, Colorado Avalanche, New York Rangers and Washington Capitals are second with three. Five teams (Calgary Flames, Chicago Blackhawks, Dallas Stars, Edmonton Oilers, Vancouver Canucks) are tied for third most with two Presidents' Trophy wins apiece. Among these multiple winners, Calgary, Dallas, Detroit, Edmonton, Vancouver, and Washington have won it in consecutive seasons.

If there are two or more teams tied for first in points in the League, then the NHL's standard tiebreaking procedure is applied, with the first tiebreaker being the team with the most regulation wins (that is, all games won except those won in overtime or in a shootout). During the shortened , both the Colorado Avalanche and Vegas Golden Knights finished tied for first with 82 points in 56 games, with Colorado winning the trophy since they had 35 regulation wins while Vegas had 30. From the  through  seasons, the first tiebreaker was most regulation and overtime wins. Before , the first tiebreaker was the most wins including both overtime and shootout wins.

Past trophies
From 1937 to 1967, the same criterion now observed for winning the Presidents' Trophy was used to award the Prince of Wales Trophy. With the Modern Era expansion in the  season and the creation of the West Division, the Wales Trophy was awarded to the team that finished in first place in the East Division during the regular season. However, no trophy was awarded to the team that finished with the best overall record in the entire League during this period, and no trophy at all was awarded based on the results of the regular season from the  through  seasons. The cash bonus is split amongst the players on the active roster of the winning team.

Detroit is second with 18 first-overall finishes.

Playoff implications

The Presidents' Trophy winner is normally guaranteed home-ice advantage throughout the Stanley Cup playoffs. This does not necessarily correlate to success in the playoffs, however. The Trophy has been awarded 33 times, but only eight of the winners have gone on to win the Stanley Cup in their respective years, leading to a popular superstition that the Trophy may be cursed. In addition, seven Presidents' Trophy winners have been eliminated in the first round of the playoffs, with first-round upsets being common in the NHL compared to other major professional sports. 

NHL broadcaster Darren Eliot attributes the apparent lack of playoff success to the different style of competition compared to the regular season: instead of playing different teams every night, the goal is to advance through four best-of-seven playoff series. The Presidents' Trophy winner may have to go through other playoff clubs who might have a hotter goaltender, a better defensive team or other players that pose match-up problems. If the regular-season champion's primary success was merely outscoring others, they may be out of luck facing goaltenders that can shut them out. The lack of playoff experience may have been to blame in the examples of the 1999–2000 St. Louis Blues and 2008–09 San Jose Sharks, as neither team had advanced past the second round for five or more seasons. Teams have often given up pursuit of finishing first in the League in order to avoid injuries and rest key players for the postseason. Another example of the curse is the 2018–19 Tampa Bay Lightning, who were swept in the first round by the Wild Card Columbus Blue Jackets after a dominant season in which they tied the 1995–96 Detroit Red Wings' record for regular season wins, becoming the first President's Trophy winner to suffer this fate. Adding to the ignominy was the Blue Jackets' previous lack of post-season success: their sweep of the Lightning was their first playoff series victory in franchise history, with only four previous playoff qualifications. The 1995–96 Red Wings could also be considered a "cursed" team, as their record-setting season was cut short by the newly-relocated Colorado Avalanche in the Conference Finals, sparking a particularly vicious rivalry between the two teams in subsequent seasons. 

Ian Cooper, writing for the Toronto Star, noted that "of 11 Presidents' Trophy winners to lose in the first two rounds, seven came from divisions that were among the league’s weaker half ... If a team dominates a weak division, its shortcomings should become apparent once it faces stiffer competition from the rest of the conference". Jonathan Weiss, writing for the Bleacher Report in 2010, also noted that of the teams between 1982 and 2009 that led the League in points during the regular season, 12 of them (45 per cent) reached the Cup Finals, while of the other 405 teams during that same time period, only 42 (10 per cent) advanced to the final round.

Winners

Bold Team with the most points ever accumulated in a season during the trophy's existence.

Earlier best records

NHL vs. PCHA/WCHL/WHL Stanley Cup era (1917–1926)
Prior to 1926–27, the Stanley Cup was then awarded as a "World Series" trophy between the champions of the NHL and a rival league (first the Pacific Coast Hockey Association, then the Western Canada Hockey League). Instead, the NHL championship trophy during this era was the O'Brien Trophy.

NHL takes control of the Stanley Cup (since 1927)
After the 1925–26 season, the NHL became the only league left competing for the Stanley Cup. The Stanley Cup thus became the de facto NHL championship trophy, though the league did not take formal control of the trophy until 1947.
 

Records

Presidents' Trophy winners

Combined pre-trophy/trophy era best records

 Defunct teams in italics.

See also
 Continental Cup, a KHL trophy having the same function as the Presidents' Trophy.
 Maurice Podoloff Trophy, an NBA trophy having the same function as the Presidents' Trophy.
 Supporters' Shield, an MLS trophy having the same function as the Presidents' Trophy.

References

General
 
 
 

Specific

 
National Hockey League trophies and awards